The 1924 Fresno State Bulldogs football team represented Fresno State Normal School—now known as California State University, Fresno—during the 1924 college football season.

Fresno State competed in the California Coast Conference (CCC) from 1922 to 1924. The 1924 team was led by head coach Arthur W. Jones in his fourth year at the helm. They finished the regular season with a record of seven wins and one loss (7–1, 3–0 CCC).

At the end of the season, the Bulldogs played the co-champion of the conference in the CCC championship game. They were shut out by Chico State in the game, bringing their overall record to seven wins and two losses (7–2, 3–0 CCC). The Bulldogs outscored their opponents 132–44 for the season, including shutting out the other team five times.

Schedule

Notes

References

Fresno State
Fresno State Bulldogs football seasons
Fresno State Bulldogs football